Graeme Gleaves (born 20 June 1968) is a British writer and a Railway historian, and preservationist best known for his transport books. He has had a total of three books published to date 'Electrifying the Underground: The Technology That Created London's Tube', 'Electric Railways of Liverpool and Manchester'. and 'North Eastern Electric Stock 1904 - 2020'.

Writing Career

Gleaves started writing articles for newsletters of railway preservation groups and was editor of the Suburban Electric Railway Association's magazines; The ARC (1996-2006) and from 2006 to the present day 'The Contactor'. He subsequently wrote short articles for national periodic railway magazines and went onto to produce articles for the Suburban Electric Railway Association website history pages. It was these that attracted the attention of commissioning editor for Amberley Publishing who contacted Gleaves in 2013 asking if he would be willing to expand the pages into a book. Gleaves accepted and this resulted in his first published book 'Electrifying the Underground' appearing in February 2014. A second title, The Electric Railways of Liverpool and Manchester was published by Amberley in 2015. Gleaves was contracted to Pen and Sword Books to author three titles for them; the first of which, North Eastern Electric Stock 1904 - 2020 was published in September 2021 and was Gleaves' first title to be published in hardback. Gleaves also contributed a chapter to the book The East Kent Railway by John Scott-Morgan which was also published by Pen & Sword in 2021.

Railway Preservation

Gleaves founded the Suburban Electric Railway Association in 1995, and the group secured rare examples of electric multiple unit for preservation, notably the last surviving examples of class 503, 4-SUB and class 457. Gleaves was the first chairman at the Electric Railway Museum. and during his tenure the organisation won the Heritage Railway Association 'Small Group Award in 2011. Gleaves resigned in 2013 but accepted an offer to return as a trustee 12 months later. He managed the project to clear the Electric Railway Museum site during the latter half of 2017 and first half of 2018 to ensure all rail mounted items and heritage buildings found new homes when the redevelopment of the site caused the closure of the museum. The project won much praise in railway heritage circles as it was achieved in not only a short timescale, but with no external financial support other than what the ERM could raise itself.

After the closure of the Electric Railway Museum Gleaves set up the Heritage Electric Trains Trust  a charity to take forward the preservation of the 4-SUB and 503 units and acts as Chairman of the Trustees. In addition he continues to be the Chairman of the Suburban Electric Railway Association.

Gleaves has also acted in a consultative capacity to national bodies as an expert on the subject of electric railway history in the UK.

Personal life
Gleaves currently lives in Croydon and works as a driving instructor for Southeastern. He previously worked for South West Trains. 
He is passionate about music and began playing guitar at the age of 18. He has been a member of the following bands: Spillage (2004-2008), Fair Faith (2008-2009) and Mega-Rush (2010-2018). Graeme reformed Spillage in 2019.

References

External links
 | The Heritage Electric Trains Trust
 | The Suburban Electric Railway Association

1968 births
Living people
People from Rainham, Kent